Pfaffenberg is a mountain in Hohenstein-Ernstthal in the state of Saxony, southeastern Germany. It is part of the Saxon Uplands.

In the 1860s, the Royal Saxon Triangulation operated station number 16 on the Pfaffenberg. The triangulation point is still visible.

Mountains of Saxony